Debjit Ghosh (born 23 February 1974) is a former Indian football player. During his playing days, Ghosh played for Mohun Bagan, Mahindra United, East Bengal, and Mohammedan in the National Football League from 1996 to 2007. He also represented India between 1997 and 2006.

Club career
Born in Kolkata, West Bengal, Ghosh started his playing career with Kolkata football giants East Bengal in 1996. He Joined Mohun Bagan in the Year 1997.He stayed at the club until 2002, becoming captain for one year in 2001. He moved to Mumbai-based side Mahindra United for one season before moving to Mohun Bagan Kolkata rivals, East Bengal. He stayed at the club until 2006 before moving to the third Kolkata football giant, Mohammedan. He stayed at the club for one season before retiring.

2003 collapse
On 21 July 2003, during an 2003 ASEAN Club Championship quarter-final match for East Bengal against Persita Tangerang of Indonesia, Ghosh was knocked-out unconscious by the elbow of Tangerang player Zaenal Arief. It took five minutes before the East Bengal club doctor was able to aide Ghosh as the players and the 8,000 spectators at the stadium feared the worst. Eventually Ghosh was stretched onto an ambulance and taken to Mintohardjo NAVY Hospital with a concussion. He managed to recover and was released from the hospital that same night at 9 pm.

The collapse was described to be similar to the collapse of Cameroonian international Marc-Vivien Foé who died after a heart-related collapse during the Confederations Cup only a month before.

International
Ghosh represented the India national football team from 1997 to 2006. He captained the side in 2003 during the 2003 South Asian Football Federation Gold Cup.

Coaching career

Bhawanipore: 2014–2015
In 2014 it was confirmed that Ghosh was the new head coach of Calcutta Football League side Bhawanipore. After a year with the club, Ghosh left to sign as an assistant coach at his former club, East Bengal.

Honours

India
SAFF Championship: 1997; third place: 2003

India U23
 LG Cup: 2002

East Bengal
Federation Cup: 1996

References

External links
 

1974 births
Living people
Footballers from Kolkata
Mohun Bagan AC players
Mahindra United FC players
East Bengal Club players
Mohammedan SC (Kolkata) players
Association football defenders
Indian footballers
India international footballers
India youth international footballers
Indian football managers
Footballers at the 1998 Asian Games
Footballers at the 2002 Asian Games
Asian Games competitors for India